Gilan Tappeh (also Romanized as Gīlān Tappeh; also known as Gīlāntappeh) is a village in Qaravolan Rural District, Loveh District, Galikash County, Golestan Province, Iran. At the 2006 census, its population was 260, in 63 families.

References 

Populated places in Galikash County